So Chol (c. 1907 – 1992) was a member of North Korea's inner ruling circle, holding political and diplomatic posts.

In the 1950s and 1960s, So held several ambassadorial posts. Since 1969, he was a member of the Politburo of the Workers' Party of Korea, the highest ruling body of the party.

According to North Korea's Korean Central News Agency, he died on October 1, 1992, after a long illness, at the age of 85 years. The cause of death was not disclosed in the press release.

Works

References

People from Onsong County
1900s births
1992 deaths
Members of the 3rd Standing Committee of the Workers' Party of Korea
Members of the 4th Political Committee of the Workers' Party of Korea
Members of the 5th Political Committee of the Workers' Party of Korea
Members of the 6th Politburo of the Workers' Party of Korea
Members of the 2nd Central Committee of the Workers' Party of Korea
Members of the 3rd Central Committee of the Workers' Party of Korea
Members of the 4th Central Committee of the Workers' Party of Korea
Members of the 5th Central Committee of the Workers' Party of Korea
Members of the 6th Central Committee of the Workers' Party of Korea
People of 88th Separate Rifle Brigade